Miss Grand Dominican Republic is a female national beauty pageant in the Dominican Republic, founded in 2016 by a Dominican American business person, Chantel Martinez, with the aim of selecting a country representative to participate in its parent pageant, Miss Grand International. In 2022, the competition franchise belonged to the Iconic Model Search Inc, chaired by Joe Amhed, who served as the national director of Miss Earth Puerto Rico as well.

Since the first participation in 2013, the Dominican Republic won the Miss Grand International competition once in 2015, through a Rhode Island-based model, Anea Garcia, but was later replaced by the first runner-up from Australia, Claire Parker, due to being unable to fulfill the agreement with the international organizer.

History
Since the first participation of the Dominican Republic in Miss Grand International in 2013, the national pageant that was specifically held for the said international stage happened only once in 2016, under the leadership of Chantel Martinez, the first runner-up , who served as the national director of Miss Grand Dominican Republic during 2014 – 2018. Since no other edition of such a national contest has been additionally held, all the ensuing representatives were either appointed or gained the right from other contests; for instance, the winners or runners-up of the Misses of Dominican Republic pageant were designated as Miss Grand Dominican Republic in 2020 and 2021.

The Dominican Republic got the placements in Miss Grand International seven times, the best rank was the winner in 2015, won by a Dominican American from Rhode Island, but was later dethroned in early 2016 and the first runner-up from Australia was promoted to take over the title.

The following list is the Dominican representatives that got placements in Miss Grand International:

 2013: Chantel Martínez (First runner-up)
 2015: Anea Garcia (Winner)
 2018: Mayté Brito (Top 10)
 2019: Stéphanie Bustamante (Top 20)
 2020: Lady León (Top 20)
 2021: Stephanie Medina (Top 20)
 2022: Jearmanda Ramos (Top 20)

Editions
The Miss Grand Dominican Republic pageant was separately held only once in 2016, the following table is the competition detail of such contest.

Representatives at Miss Grand International

Winner gallery

National pageant candidates

  Winner
  Runners-up
  Finalists
  Semifinalists

References

External links

 

Dominican Republic
Beauty pageants in the Dominican Republic
Recurring events established in 2016
2016 establishments in the Dominican Republic